Robert Stephen Herman (born 30 November 1946 in Southampton, Hampshire) is a former English cricketer who played County Cricket for Middlesex from 1965 to 1971 and Hampshire from 1972 to 1977. He played in South Africa for Border in 1972/3 and for Griqualand West in 1974/5. He also played in the Minor Counties Championship for Dorset in 1978 and 1979. 

Between 1979 and 1982, he umpired 61 first-class cricket matches. He then took up teaching.

His father, Lofty Herman, also played for Hampshire.

References

External links
 
Profile from CricketArchive

1946 births
Living people
English cricketers
Border cricketers
Dorset cricketers
Griqualand West cricketers
Hampshire cricketers
Middlesex cricketers
Minor Counties cricketers
Cricketers from Southampton
English cricket umpires